Dominic Carmon, S.V.D. (December 13, 1930 – November 11, 2018) was an American prelate of the Roman Catholic Church. He served as an auxiliary bishop of the Archdiocese of New Orleans from 1993 to 2006.

Biography
The eldest of seven sons, Carmon was born in Opelousas, Louisiana. He studied at the seminary of the Society of the Divine Word in Bay St. Louis, Mississippi, and at Divine Word College in Epworth, Iowa. He joined the Society of the Divine Word in 1946, and was ordained to the priesthood on February 2, 1960. He served as a missionary to Papua New Guinea from 1961 to 1968. He was pastor of St. Elizabeth's Church (1968-1985) and of Our Lady of the Gardens Church (1985-1988), both in Chicago, Illinois, before serving as pastor of Holy Ghost Church in his native Opelousas, the largest Black Catholic church in the country.

On December 16, 1992, Carmon was appointed Auxiliary Bishop of New Orleans and Titular Bishop of Rusicade by Pope John Paul II. He received his episcopal consecration on February 11, 1993, from Archbishop Francis Schulte, with Bishops Wilton Gregory and Harry Flynn serving as co-consecrators.

After reaching the mandatory retirement age of 75, Carmon resigned as Auxiliary Bishop of New Orleans on December 13, 2006. He died on November 11, 2018, at the age of 87.

See also
 

 Catholic Church hierarchy
 Catholic Church in the United States
 Historical list of the Catholic bishops of the United States
 List of Catholic bishops of the United States
 Lists of patriarchs, archbishops, and bishops

References

External links
 Roman Catholic Archdiocese of New Orleans Official Site
 National Black Catholic Congress bio of Dominic Carmon
 National Black Catholic Clergy Caucus bio of Dominic Carmon

Episcopal succession

1930 births
2018 deaths
People from Opelousas, Louisiana
21st-century Roman Catholic bishops in the United States
African-American Roman Catholic bishops
Catholics from Louisiana
Divine Word Missionaries Order
20th-century Roman Catholic bishops in the United States
20th-century African-American people
21st-century African-American people
African-American Catholic consecrated religious